Upendra Chivukula (born October 8, 1950) is a Democratic politician who currently serves as a Commissioner on the New Jersey Board of Public Utilities after serving more than 12 years in the New Jersey General Assembly, where he had been the Deputy Speaker.

On September 18, 2014, Chivukula was nominated by Governor Chris Christie to a seat on the New Jersey Board of Public Utilities, to replace retiring NJ BPU Commissioner Jeanne Fox.  The New Jersey Senate voted 35–1 to confirm Chivukula to a six-year term on the New Jersey Board of Public Utilities on September 22, 2014.

In 2014, he ran in the Democratic primary to fill retiring Congressman Rush Holt's seat in Congress, but he did not win the nomination.

Chivukula served in the New Jersey General Assembly from 2002 to 2014, where he represented the 17th Legislative District. In 2001, Chivukula became the first Indian American elected to the New Jersey General Assembly and the fourth Indian American in the United States to be elected to state office.

Biography

Chivukula served as the New Jersey General Assembly's Deputy Speaker from 2007 to 2014. Chivukula was noted for being a progressive legislator and, in coordination with Congressman Rush D. Holt Jr., pushed through reforms to invest in clean energy, infrastructure projects, and high-tech manufacturing jobs.

Chivukula served on the Franklin Township Council from 1998 to 2005. He was first elected to represent the 5th Council Ward in 1997, and won re-election to his 5th Ward seat in 2001. He served as the township deputy mayor in 1998 and as mayor in 2000.

In Franklin Township, he has also served on the Franklin Township Community Foundation, Finance Oversight Committee, Traffic Management Committee, Fire Prevention Board, Emergency Life Support Delivery, Integrated Communications Committee, Emergency Management, Franklin Township Planning Board, Economic Development Committee, Community / Senior Center Steering Committee and the Bicentennial Celebration Committee. Chivukula has served on the Somerset County Affordable Housing Board of Trustees and the Middlesex County Cultural and Historic Commission. He was appointed by then Governor of New Jersey James Florio to be a Public Member of the New Jersey State Board of Social Work Examiners, where he served from 1994 to 1997.

He was a member of the delegation to the Democratic National Convention in 1996, 2000, 2008, and 2012 and was an alternate delegate in 2004.

Chivukula was one of New Jersey's presidential electors casting the state's Electoral College votes after the 2004 presidential election; New Jersey's electors cast their ballots on December 13, 2004, in the State House Annex in Trenton, where all 15 votes were cast for Democratic Party candidate John Kerry.

On November 6, 2012, he ran for Congress against Republican incumbent U.S. Representative Leonard Lance to represent New Jersey's 7th congressional district in the United States House of Representatives.  He was defeated in the heavily Republican district 57%–40% with a vote of 175,662 to 123,057.

On June 3, 2014, he ran for Congress against NJ state Assemblywoman Bonnie Watson Coleman, NJ state Senator Linda R. Greenstein, and physicist Andrew Zwicker in the Democratic primary for New Jersey's 12th congressional district in the United States House of Representatives, to succeed retiring Congressman Rush D. Holt Jr.  Chivukula came in third place in the primary with 21.8%, losing to Watson Coleman and Greenstein, who received 43% and 27.8% of the primary vote, respectively.

Chivukula received a B.E.E. from College of Engineering, Guindy (now part of Anna University) in electrical engineering and an M.E.E. degree from City College of New York in electrical engineering. He was born in Nellore, India, and currently resides in Somerset, New Jersey.

In 2015, Chivukula co-authored "THE 3rd WAY" with Veny Musum which advocates closing the broadening gap between the rich and the poor in America and worldwide through Inclusive Capitalism, or Economic Democracy via business initiatives like increasing an employee's equity stake and other methods of increasing profit sharing among all employees.

Election history

See also
 Indian Americans in New Jersey

References

External links
New Jersey Legislature financial disclosure forms – 2013 2012 2011 2010 2009 2008 2007 2006 2005 2004
Assembly Member Upendra J. Chivukula, Project Vote Smart

1950 births
Living people
American Hindus
City College of New York alumni
Indian emigrants to the United States
American politicians of Indian descent
Asian-American people in New Jersey politics
American mayors of Indian descent
Mayors of places in New Jersey
American people of Telugu descent
Democratic Party members of the New Jersey General Assembly
New Jersey city council members
People from Franklin Township, Somerset County, New Jersey
Politicians from Somerset County, New Jersey
State cabinet secretaries of New Jersey
2004 United States presidential electors
21st-century American politicians
Recipients of Pravasi Bharatiya Samman